Serenade of Texas (French: Sérénade au Texas) is a 1958 French musical western film directed by Richard Pottier and starring Luis Mariano, Bourvil and Germaine Damar. In the 1890s, a Frenchman discovers that he has inherited property in a rowdy Texas town.

The film's sets were designed by the art director Rino Mondellini. Shooting took place at the Victorine Studios in Nice. It was shot in Eastmancolor.

Cast
 Luis Mariano as Jacques Gardel  
 Bourvil as Me Jérôme Quilleboeuf  
 Germaine Damar as Rose  
 René Blancard as Le shérif 
 Robert Rocca as Un fonctionnaire  
 Jean Pâqui as Dawson 
 Paul Mercey as Bill  
 Gil Delamare as Harry  
 André Philip as Le commissaire  
 Albert Michel as Albert - l'employé du magasin  
 Jean-François Martial
 Henri Arius 
 Micheline Gary as Denise  
 Liliane Bel
 Arlette Poirier as Dolorès  
 Yves Deniaud as Roderick 
 Les Bluebell Girls as Dancers from the Lido 
 Sonja Ziemann as Sylvia  
 Miguel Gamy as Clark  
 Jacqueline Georges as Dorothy  
 Nicole Jonesco as Rita  
 Lucien Raimbourg as Ben  
 Sylvain as Le garcon

References

Bibliography 
 Hayward, Susan. French Costume Drama of the 1950s: Fashioning Politics in Film. Intellect Books, 2010.

External links 
 

1958 films
French Western (genre) musical films
1950s Western (genre) musical films
1950s French-language films
Films directed by Richard Pottier
Films set in the 1890s
French historical musical films
1950s historical musical films
Films set in Texas
Films shot at Victorine Studios
1950s French films